The 2008 Vallelunga Superbike World Championship round was the twelfth round of the 2008 Superbike World Championship season. It took place on the weekend of September 19-21, 2008, at the Vallelunga circuit.

Superbike race 1 classification

Superbike race 2 classification

Supersport race classification

Vallelunga Round
Vallelunga